Saulnierville is a rural Acadian fishing community founded in 1785, located in Nova Scotia, Canada. It contains the French Shore's largest fish processing plant, Comeau Sea Foods, which has been in operations since 1946. Saulnierville also has one of the oldest churches in the region, Sacré Cœur (Sacred Heart) Church, built in 1880. The Vélo Baie Sainte-Marie bicycle shop in Saulnierville is the starting point of the Gran Fondo Baie Sainte-Marie, a mass-start cycling ride of the French Shore in late September. It is located in Digby County.

In 2020, the community was the centre of a lobster fishing dispute between Mi'kmaq and non-indigenous fishers.

References

Communities in Digby County, Nova Scotia
General Service Areas in Nova Scotia